McCracken County Public Schools (MCPS) is a school district headquartered in Hendron, unincorporated McCracken County, Kentucky.

The district serves all of McCracken County except for most of the area within the city limits of Paducah, which is served by its own independent school district. However, portions of the city, especially in the west, lie within the McCracken County district, and feed either Heath or Lone Oak Middle School. There are currently eleven schools that make up the MCPS district.

On August 9, 2013, a new McCracken County High School opened, combining  the three previous high schools. Lone Oak Middle School  moved into the former Lone Oak High building. The previous Lone Oak Middle building became Lone Oak Intermediate School, serving 4th and 5th grade students who had in the past attended Lone Oak and Hendron–Lone Oak Elementary Schools.

Schools
High schools (grades 9 to 12)
 McCracken County High School, Paducah (replaced Lone Oak, Heath, and Reidland High Schools).
Middle schools (grades 6 to 8)
Through the 2011–12 school year, each of these schools fed exclusively to the high school that shared its name. Since 2012–13, they feed McCracken County High.
 Heath Middle School, West Paducah
 Lone Oak Middle School, Lone Oak
 Reidland Middle School, Reidland

Primary schools (grades K to 5) here are listed by the middle schools that they feed.

Heath
 Concord Elementary School
 Heath Elementary School
Lone Oak
 Lone Oak Intermediate School (grades 4–5)
 Hendron Lone Oak Elementary School (K–3)
 Lone Oak Elementary School (K–3)
Reidland
 Farley Elementary School
 Reidland Elementary School

References

External links

McCracken County Public Schools

School districts in Kentucky
Education in McCracken County, Kentucky